María Ostolaza (born 26 February 1953) is a Peruvian volleyball player. She competed in the women's tournament at the 1976 Summer Olympics.

References

External links
 

1953 births
Living people
Peruvian women's volleyball players
Olympic volleyball players of Peru
Volleyball players at the 1976 Summer Olympics
Place of birth missing (living people)
Pan American Games medalists in volleyball
Pan American Games silver medalists for Peru
Medalists at the 1971 Pan American Games
Medalists at the 1975 Pan American Games
20th-century Peruvian women